Arntor is the second studio album by Norwegian black metal band Windir. It was released on 11 October 1999 through the record label Head Not Found. It is the last record released with Valfar playing the majority of the instruments.

Track listing

Critical reception 

AllMusic praised the album, writing, "this album's importance in the grand scheme of Scandinavian heavy metal is difficult to overstate, and if Sweden's Bathory were responsible for introducing the Viking metal concept to begin with, then the watershed Arntor gave Windir a strong case as heirs to their throne, by showing the way forward for the genre's future disciples."

Personnel
 Valfar – guitar, bass guitar, synthesizer, vocals, accordion, producer, mixing

Additional personnel
B. T. Aroy - keyboards on "Ending"
I. R. Aroy - guitars on tracks 2, 4 and 6
Steinarson - clean vocals
Steingrim - drums
Harjar - lead guitars on "Kong Hydnes haug" and "Kampen"
Vegard Bakken - photography
Erik Evju - layout
J. E. Bjork - graphic design
Pytten - mixing

References 

Windir albums
1999 albums